The Mark 29 torpedo was a submarine-launched, acoustic torpedo designed by Westinghouse Electric in 1945 for the United States Navy. It used the same acoustic system as the Mark 28 torpedo but was faster, operated at various depths, had an external depth setter, and could run as either a straight or a homing torpedo. The Mod 1 variant had two speeds, a remote-setting variable enabler and an anti-circular run device.

In April 1945, the Mark 29 program was discontinued.

See also
American 21 inch torpedo

References

Torpedoes
Torpedoes of the United States
Unmanned underwater vehicles